Dawson is a Scottish surname. Notable persons with the 
surname include:

Ally Dawson (1958–2021), Scottish football manager 
Aaron Dawson (born 1992), English footballer
Abraham Dawson (1816–1884), Irish-Canadian Anglican cleric
Adrian Dawson (born 1971), British author
Aeneas Dawson (1810–1894), Scottish-Canadian priest and writer
Agnes Dawson (1873–1953), British politician and trade unionist
Alan Dawson (1929–1996), American drummer
Alex Dawson (1940–2020), Scottish football player
Alexander Dawson, New South Wales Government Architect, 1856–1862
Alma Dawson, American scholar of librarianship
Ambrose Dawson (1707–1794), English physician
Anderson Dawson (1863–1910), Australian politician
Andre Dawson (born 1954), American baseball player
Andy Dawson (born 1978), English footballer
Andy Dawson (born 1979), English footballer
Angela Dawson (died 2002), American community activist
Angela Dawson (born 1968), British canoer
Anna Dawson (born 1937), English actress and singer
Anne Dawson, English academic and former broadcast journalist
Anne Dawson (1896–1989), British spy in occupied Belgium in WW1
Anthony Dawson (1916–1992), Scottish actor
Archibald Dawson (1892–1938), Scottish sculptor
Archie Owen Dawson (1898–1964), American federal judge
Artie Dawson (1891–1982), Australian rules footballer
Ashlé Dawson (born 1984), American choreographer, director, and dancer
Ashley Dawson, American author, activist and professor
Barbara Dawson (born 1957), Irish art historian, museum gallery director, and curator
Beatrice Dawson (1908–1976), British costume designer
Benjamin Dawson (1729–1814), English minister and linguist
Bernhard Dawson (1890–1960), American-Argentinian astronomer
Bertrand Dawson, 1st Viscount Dawson of Penn (1864–1945), British physician
Bess Phipps Dawson (1916–1994), American painter
Beth Dawson, American statistician
Branden Dawson (born 1993), American basketball player 
Brendon Dawson (born 1967), Zimbabwean rugby union footballer and coach
Brian Dawson (disambiguation)
Brigid Dawson, British musician 
Brihony Dawson (born 1984), Australian television presenter, sports commentator and singer
Cameron Dawson (born 1995), English football player
Carroll Dawson, American basketball assistant coach and general manager
Casey Dawson (born 2000), American speed skater
Chad Dawson (born 1982), American boxer
Charles Dawson (disambiguation)
Christopher Dawson (1889–1970), British historian
Clifton Dawson (born 1983), Canadian gridiron football player
Clive Dawson, British screenwriter
Coningsby Dawson (1883–1959), English-American novelist
Connor Dawson (born 1993), American baseball coach
Craig Dawson (born 1990), English footballer
Curt Dawson (1939–1985), American stage and television actor
Dale Dawson (born 1964), American football player
Dan Dawson (born 1981), Canadian lacrosse player
Daniel Dawson (born 1977), Australian kickboxer and boxer
Daryl Dawson (born 1933), Australian judge and naval officer
David Dawson (disambiguation)
Dawn Dawson, American jetski racer and commentator
Dennis Dawson (born 1949), Canadian politician
Dermontti Dawson (born 1965), former American football player
Digger Dawson (1905–?), English professional footballer
Donald Dawson (1908–2005), American lawyer and presidential aide
Donald A. Dawson (born 1937), Canadian mathematician
Duke Dawson (born 1996), American football player
Earl Dawson (1925–1987), Canadian politician and ice hockey administrator
Eddie Dawson (1904–1979), English cricketer
Edgar Dawson (1931–2015), English rugby league footballer
Edgar Gilmer Dawson (1830–1883), American lawyer, planter, and major
Ellen Dawson (1900–1967), Scottish-American trade union activist
Eric Dawson (born 1984), American basketball player
Eric E. Dawson (1937–2017), American politician
Ernest Dawson (1882–1947), American antiquarian bookseller and Sierra Club president
Frances L. Dawson (1903–1995), American educator and politician
Fred Dawson (1884–1965), American college sports coach
Geoffrey Dawson (1874–1944), British newspaper editor 
George Dawson (disambiguation)
Geralyn Dawson, American romance novelist
Gladys Dawson (1909–1993), English artist 
Glen Dawson (1906–1968), American steeplechase runner
Glen Dawson (1912–2016), American mountaineer
Greg Dawson (born 1950), American consumer rights columnist
Hailey Dawson (born 2010), American record setter
Henry Dawson (disambiguation)
Hilton Dawson (born 1953), British politician
Horace Dawson (born 1926), American diplomat
Jack Dawson (disambiguation)
Jaimie Dawson (born 1969), Canadian badminton player
James Dawson (disambiguation)
Janet Dawson (born 1935), Australian artist
Joe or Joseph Dawson (disambiguation)
John Dawson (disambiguation)
Jonathan Dawson (1941–2013), Australian academic, filmmaker, film and literary critic and broadcaster
Keyunta Dawson (born 1985), American football player
Kimya Dawson (born 1972), American singer-songwriter
Lafayette Dawson (1839–1897), American lawyer and judge
Len Dawson (born 1935), American football player
Les Dawson (1931–1993), British comedian
Lynne Dawson (born 1956), English soprano
Mabel Dawson (1887–1965), Scottish artist
Margaret Dawson (1770–1816), convict on the First Fleet
Matt Dawson (born 1972), English rugby player
Michael Dawson (disambiguation)
Montagu Dawson (1919–2003), Royal Air Force officer
Montague Dawson (1890–1973), maritime artist
Nicholas Mosby Dawson, Texas ranger, killed during the Dawson massacre
Ossie Dawson (1919–2008), South African cricketer
Peter Dawson (disambiguation)
Phil Dawson (born 1975), American football player
Phire Dawson, American model
Portia Dawson, American actress
Rachel Dawson (born 1985), American field hockey player
Rian Dawson, American drummer
Richard Dawson (disambiguation)
Robert Dawson (disambiguation)
Roger Dawson (born 1940), American jazz musician, composer, and DJ
Ronnie Dawson (born 1995), American baseball player
Ronnie Dawson (born 1932), Irish rugby player
Rosario Dawson (born 1979), American actress
Roxann Dawson (born 1958), American actress and director
Sally Dawson (born 1955), American theoretical physicist
Sandra Dawson (disambiguation)
Scott Dawson (born 1984), American professional wrestler
Shane Dawson (born 1988), American comedian and actor
Shawn Dawson (born 1993), Israeli basketball player
Simon James Dawson (1818–1902), Scottish-Canadian engineer and politician
Smoky Dawson (1913–2008), Australian singer and entertainer
Thomas Dawson (disambiguation)
Tommy Dawson (1901–1977), English footballer
Trent Dawson (born 1971), American actor
Walt Dawson (born 1982), American Alzheimer's disease activist
Walter Dawson (1902–1994), British air chief marshal
William Dawson (disambiguation)

Characters
Ally Dawson from Austin & Ally
Antonio Dawson, a character on the television series Chicago P.D.
Bella Dawson from Bella and the Bulldogs
Caroline Dawson, a character in the UK drama series Last Tango in Halifax
Dudley "Booger" Dawson, a character in the Revenge of the Nerds franchise
Eddie Dawson, of Monk Dawson and the film adaptation Monk Dawson
Frank Dawson, a character in the 1959–1960 syndicated TV series This Man Dawson
Frank Dawson, a character in the 2013 American black comedy crime film Life of Crime
Jack Dawson, the lead character from the 1997 film Titanic
Joe Dawson, a character on the TV show Highlander
J.M. Dawson, a character in The Adventures of Tintin comic series adventure The Blue Lotus
Margaret "Mickey" Dawson, a character played by Jennifer Aniston in the 2013 American black comedy crime film Life of Crime
Michael Dawson, a character on the TV show Lost
Monica Dawson, a character on the TV show Heroes
Polly Dawson, a character in the TV sitcom Soap

See also
Dawson Dawson-Walker (1868–1934), British clergyman, classicist, theologian and academic
Dawson (disambiguation)

References

English-language surnames
Surnames of English origin
Patronymic surnames
Surnames from given names